Vyšný Klátov (1332/5 Superior Turastukes, 1397 Fel Teukes, 1400 Superior Bokkenzeifin, 1580 Ober-Beckseyffen) is a village and municipality in Košice-okolie District in the Košice Region of eastern Slovakia.

History
In historical records the village was first mentioned in 1317 as a German medieval settlement. It belonged to Košice town. On February 28, 2010 a meteorite impact was recorded in the Eastern Slovakia, the first fragments were found on March 20, 2010 near the village.

Geography

Ethnicity
Approximately half of the population is Slovak in ethnicity, the other half is Magyar.

Culture

References

External links

http://www.cassovia.sk/klatov/

Villages and municipalities in Košice-okolie District